, simply known as , is the drummer and backup vocalist of Japanese nu metal band Maximum the Hormone.

Career
Nao is the co-founding member of Maximum the Hormone with Daisuke Tsuda. She recruited her brother Ryo Kawakita to play guitar after Sugi and Key left the band. Her drumming is heavy with the band's sound, while her vocals are light and pop-styled.

Nao announced in January 2009 that she was going to get married. In November 2009 it was announced that she is pregnant. At first it was decided that the band would not book any more shows, but would proceed with all booked shows. However, on November 3, after the Jigokuezu 2009 Akihabara show, Nao was ill with bleeding and abdominal pain. She was transported by ambulance to a hospital, where a doctor prescribed medicine and told her to have "absolute bed rest". Nao has expressed some frustration: "I could not be wild with joy because I am the mother of the baby but at the same time, I am the drummer of Maximum the Hormone. I have never felt unhappy with being a woman as a drummer. I have never [been] treated wrong either. But this time, I thought if I were a man, I could play drums without caring about the pregnancy. And I also thought that if I was [sic] an ordinary woman, I wouldn't have to worry this much. This was the first time I suffered by [sic] the gender problem." But she was also pleased about the pregnancy, saying that "It was something so desired since I had always been yearned [sic] to be a mother and my husband loves children a lot."

Originally, the band had planned two more Jigokuezu shows and the Soundwave Festival 2010 in Australia—especially the latter, since it would have been during the "stable period" of Nao's pregnancy, but these were cancelled because of Nao's complications. The band has said that they "would like to apologize to all the artists and promoters who invited MTH to this show", but that they "would like to give top priority to the health of the mother and the baby". Nao returned to drumming after she gave birth and recovered.

Personal life
Nao gave birth to a 7.5-pound girl on May 6, 2010, at 6:01 am. She was in labor for seven hours. While Nao said that she was "very happy", she did voice disappointment that her belly hadn't shrunk back to its normal size.

After giving birth, Nao was enthusiastic to get back to drumming. "...I need to start working out and get ready because I have to fight with hungry MtH fans in Japan who have waited to see our shows! ... I guarantee that you are going to see the new, better MtH!"

Nao has commented that her baby "looks totally, 150%" like former boxing world champion Guts Ishimatsu.

On May 18, 2016, it was announced that Nao was six months pregnant with her second child. She was admitted to hospital on September 8 and gave birth to a girl at 11:44am the next day.

Cited influences
Unicorn
Ringo Shiina
Chara
Cordiality Brothers
The High-Lows
Ulfuls
Combine Space

Resources

1975 births
Living people
Japanese heavy metal drummers
Japanese rock drummers
Japanese women musicians
Women drummers
Musicians from Hachiōji, Tokyo
Musicians from Kanagawa Prefecture
Nu metal drummers
Nu metal singers
21st-century Japanese women musicians
21st-century drummers
Women in metal